The National Honey Show is an annual British show of honey and other bee products.

It first took place in 1923 at The Crystal Palace, and continued to be held there until 1936, when The Crystal Palace burnt down. For a time it was held at St George's College, Weybridge, Surrey; it is now held every October at Sandown Park Racecourse. 

Events that take place at the show include several competitions (e.g. honey, mead, and beeswax), workshops and lectures.

See also
Beekeeping in the United Kingdom

External links
National Honey Show

Honey
Agricultural shows in the United Kingdom
Beekeeping in the United Kingdom
Food and drink festivals in the United Kingdom
Annual events in the United Kingdom
1923 establishments in the United Kingdom
Festivals established in 1923